Ernestina Sucre Tapia  (November 24, 1892 - July 2, 1982), was a Panamanian teacher and poet who is mostly known for writing the Oath to the Flag of Panama and for founding the Asociación de Muchachas Guías de Panamá.

Honours
:
 Commander of the Order of Vasco Núñez de Balboa

References

1892 births
1982 deaths
Panamanian women poets